The 1953 Chico State Wildcats football team represented Chico State College—now known as California State University, Chico—as a member of the Far Western Conference (FWC) during the 1953 college football season. Led by Ernie Busch in his second and final season as head coach, Chico State compiled an overall record of 6–3–1 with a mark of 4–0–1 in conference play, winning the FWC title. The team outscored its opponents 150 to 133 for the season. The Wildcats played home games at Chico High School Stadium in Chico, California.

The team included 14 returning lettermen and 16 junior college transfers. Before the season began, improved expectations for the team's performance caused ticket sales to "soar to a new high."

On November 13, Chico State played the Cal Aggies to a scoreless tie in six inches of rain and 40 mile per hour winds, as a fierce storm also caused the press box to collapse during the game.

At the end of the season, four Chico State players were selected for the All-Far Western Conference football team: guard Gene Van der Leun, end George Maderos, and backs Hal Higgins and Carroll Campbell. Busch finished his tenure as Chico State with an overall record of 7–9–1, for a .441 winning percentage.

Schedule

Notes

References

Chico State
Chico State Wildcats football seasons
Northern California Athletic Conference football champion seasons
Chico State Wildcats football